The Sarntal Alps (Italian: Alpi Sarentine) are a mountain range of the Eastern Rhaetian Alps, in South Tyrol (Italy), which surrounds the Sarntal (valley). It is limited by the Etschtal, Eisacktal, Passeiertal and the Jaufen Pass.

Topography 
The Sarntal Alps are divided into an Eastern and a Western Part, which meet at the Penser Joch. The Eastern Part has got various minor ridges.

Eastern Part 
The Southern half (south to Kassianspitze) is compared to the surrounding ranges not that elevated, its highest peaks are Villanderer Berg (2509m) and Rittner Horn (2260m), further south it becomes the Ritten.

The northern has got the Tatschspitze (2528m), Tagewaldhorn (2708m), Jakobsspitze (2742m), Schrotthorn (2590m), Plankenhorn (2543m) Kassianspitze (2581m).

The biggest minor ridge of the Sarntal Alps is the Middle Ridge, beginning at the Hörtlanerspitze (2660m), it limites the Durnholztal. Its most known peaks are Gentersbergspitze (2411m), Hoferspitze (2438m) and Leiterspitze (2375m), which is its last peak. The other minor ridge to the west is the Getrumkamm, with its peaks Plankenhorn (2589 m) and Getrumspitze.

The minor ridges on the Eisack side are due to Flaggertal and Schalderer Tal. Limited to the north by Flaggertal and to the south by Schalderer Tal exists a ridge with Karspitze (2517m) as its highest peak and limited to the north by Schalderer Tal exists a ridge with Lorenzispitze (2483m) and Königsangerspitze (2439m).

Western Part 

The southern half is not that elevated, it is called Tschöggelberg.

Its middle part consists of the highest mountains, that among the Hirzer (2781m), Alplerspitze (2750m), Hönigsspitze (2698m) and Plattinger Spitze (2670m). More to the west, there is the Ifinger.

The most notable mountains of the northern part are the Penser Weißhorn (2705 m), Zinseler (2422m), Jaufenspitze (2481m), Hochwart (2748m) and Ötsch (2592m).

Sights 
The churchhouse  is one of the highest located (2,311m) places of pilgrimage in South Tyrol.

At the southern side the Ritten, the natural phenomenum of hoodoo can be seen.

References

External links 

 
Mountain ranges of the Alps
Rhaetian Alps
Mountain ranges of South Tyrol